Goppenstein is a railway station in the Swiss canton of Valais and municipality of Ferden. The station is located on the Lötschberg line of the BLS AG, just outside the southern portal of the Lötschberg tunnel. It takes its name from the nearby hamlet of Goppenstein.

The station is served by the following passenger train:

The station is also the southern terminus of the BLS car carrying shuttle train to Kandersteg station via the Lötschberg tunnel, with trains running every 30 minutes. There is no road across the Lötschen Pass, under which the tunnel runs, and the nearest alternative road crossings lie many kilometres to the east and west.

A connecting PostAuto bus service runs through the Lötschental valley between Steg and Fafleralp. Up the valley towards Fafleralp this route runs hourly and serves the valley communities of Ferden, Kippel, Wiler and Blatten. Alternate buses continue down the valley to Steg.

References

External links 

Railway stations in the canton of Valais
BLS railway stations